Back Plains is a rural locality in the Toowoomba Region, Queensland, Australia.

History 

Settlement commenced in December 1872. The district was originally known as Clifton Homestead Area Back Plains, from which the present day locality takes its name.

Clifton Homestead Area School opened on 8 December 1879. It was renamed Back Plains State School circa 1919.

St Paul's Church of England was dedicated on 12 February 1892 by Archbishop of Brisbane William Webber. The last service was conducted on 8 August 1943. In 1953 the church building was relocated to Nobby where it was re-established as St Paul's Church of England. The last service at Nobby was conducted circa 11 May 1975. In 1979 the church building was relocated to 12 Jubb Street, Allora  to become the Scots Presbyterian Church for those Presbyterians in the district who did not wish to become part of the Uniting Church of Australia. The church in Allora was dedicated on 26 July 1980 by Presbyterian Moderator Rt Rev F. White.

A machinery business operated in December 1892 to 1910. It built threshing machines and steam engines.

A cheese factory was established in August 1896. It became a farmers' cooperative venture in 1910 and closed in 1915.

Sacred Heart Roman Catholic Church opened on 26 May 1901.

Johann (John) Bange operated a general store from 1911 to 1924. On 27 October 1935 at Clifton Bange made his maiden flight in an enclosed-fuselage glider, which he designed and built himself.

A Presbyterian church opened on 16  October 1915.

Education 
Back Plains State School is a government primary (Prep-6) school for boys and girls at 874 Clifton-Pittsworth Highway. In 2017, the school had an enrolment of 17 students with 3 teachers (2 full-time equivalent) and 5 non-teaching staff (2 full-time equivalent).

References

Further reading
 
 

Toowoomba Region
Localities in Queensland